"Stares and Whispers" is a song by the Australian Renée Geyer Band. The song was released in April 1977 as the lead single from Geyer's fourth studio album Moving Along (1977); her first to be recorded in the US and released internationally. It became Geyer's first Australian top 20 single, peaking at number 17 on the Kent Music Report. 

In April 1977, Geyer performed the song on the 100th episode of the Australian TV show Countdown, which she also co-hosted.

Track listing
 Australian 7" Single
Side A "Stares and Whispers" - 3:33
Side B "Be There in the Morning" - 4:24

Charts

Weekly charts

Year-end charts

Cover versions
 Freda Payne covered the song in her album Stares and Whispers (1977).
 Alton McClain and Destiny covered the song on the album More of You (1979)

References

Renée Geyer songs
Freda Payne songs
1977 songs
1977 singles
Mushroom Records singles
RCA Records singles